Laliberte (English: Liberty Monument) is an historic monument in Victoria, Seychelles. It was erected in celebration of the Seychelles' independence from Britain.

History
It was unveiled by James Michel on 29 June 2014 during an Independence Day celebration as a replacement of the Zonm Lib (English: free man) statue which was erected in 1978.

Design
The Liberty Monument was designed and sculpted by Tom Bowers and was cast in bronze at the Bronze
Age Foundry in Cape Town, South Africa. It depicts a man and a woman holding over their heads the national flag.

References

2014 sculptures
History of Seychelles
Monuments and memorials in Seychelles
Tourist attractions in Seychelles